Monsanto Leshawn Pope (born January 27, 1978) is a former American football defensive tackle in the National Football League. He was selected by the Denver Broncos in the seventh round (231st overall pick) in the 2002 NFL Draft out of the University of Virginia. He played four seasons for the Broncos (2002–2005) before signing as a free agent with the New York Jets in 2006. He left the team at the beginning of training camp.

References

1978 births
Living people
Players of American football from Norfolk, Virginia
American football defensive tackles
Virginia Cavaliers football players
Denver Broncos players